Julio Rodríguez or Julio César Rodríguez may refer to:

 Julio Rodríguez (photographer) (born 1956), Mexican photographer
 Julio Rodríguez (baseball) (born 2000), baseball player
 Julio Cesar Rodríguez (cyclist) (born 1966), Colombian cyclist
 Julio Rodríguez (footballer, born 1968), Uruguayan footballer
 Julio Rodríguez (footballer, born 1977), Uruguayan footballer
 Júlio Rodriguez (footballer, born 1980), Brazilian footballer
 Julio Rodríguez (footballer, born 1984), Spanish footballer
 Julio Rodríguez (footballer, born 1990), Paraguayan footballer
 Julio Rodríguez (footballer, born 1995), Spanish footballer